Troy Dixon (October 19, 1967July 15, 1990), better known as Trouble T Roy, was a hip-hop dancer with the group Heavy D and the Boyz from 1987 until his death in 1990.

Death
On July 14, 1990, while on tour in Indianapolis, Dixon and others were horseplaying after a performance and walking on a raised exit ramp outside Market Square Arena. During the commotion, someone pushed a trash barrel down the ramp. Dixon got on the ledge to avoid the barrel, however he lost his balance and fell from a height of approximately two stories. He was rushed to hospital, but died the next day of injuries he had suffered, at age 22. His death was ruled an accident.

Legacy 
Heavy D and the Boyz dedicated their next album, Peaceful Journey, to his memory in 1991.

Pete Rock & CL Smooth dedicated their song "They Reminisce Over You (T.R.O.Y.)" to him in 1992. Pete Rock discussed the song's genesis in a 2007 interview with The Village Voice:

References

1967 births
1990 deaths
Musicians from Mount Vernon, New York
American hip hop musicians
20th-century American musicians
American hip hop dancers
Accidental deaths from falls
Accidental deaths in Indiana
20th-century American dancers